Virginio Lunardi (born 23 March 1968) is an Italian former ski jumper. He competed at the 1988 Winter Olympics.

References

External links

1968 births
Living people
Italian male ski jumpers
Sportspeople from the Province of Vicenza
Olympic ski jumpers of Italy
Ski jumpers at the 1988 Winter Olympics